
Stargard County is a unit of territorial administration and local government (powiat) in West Pomeranian Voivodeship, north-western Poland. It came into being on January 1, 1999, as a result of the Polish local government reforms passed in 1998.

As of 2006 its total population is 119,402, out of which the population of Stargard is 70,534, that of Chociwel is 3,285, that of Dobrzany is 2,420, that of Ińsko is 2,001, that of Suchań is 1,446, and the rural population is 39,716.

Neighbouring counties
Stargard County is bordered by Goleniów County to the north, Łobez County to the north-east, Drawsko County to the east, Choszczno County to the south-east, Myślibórz County and Pyrzyce County to the south, and Gryfino County and the city of Szczecin to the west.

Administrative division
The county is subdivided into 10 gminas (one urban, four urban-rural and five rural). These are listed in the following table, in descending order of population.

References
Polish official population figures 2006

 
Stargard